This is a list of all winners of the Premio Jabuti in the Literary Novel category since 1959.

Winners

References 

Brazilian literary awards